Konstantinos Tsamouris (born 14 November 1994) is a Greek professional footballer who plays as a centre-back for Super League 2 club Apollon Smyrnis.

References

1994 births
Living people
Greek footballers
Greece youth international footballers
Greek expatriate footballers
Super League Greece 2 players
Regionalliga players
Football League (Greece) players
Gamma Ethniki players
Xanthi F.C. players
PAS Lamia 1964 players
1. FC Kaiserslautern II players
Panserraikos F.C. players
Platanias F.C. players
Association football defenders
Footballers from Kavala